Chvostek may refer to:

Chvostek sign, a clinical sign of existing nerve hyperexcitability
Annabelle Chvostek (born 1973), Canadian singer-songwriter based
Milan Chvostek (1932–2018), producer and director
František Chvostek (1835–1884), Czech-Austrian military physician